Wearing is a surname, and may refer to:

 Alison Wearing (born 1967), Canadian writer
 Ben Wearing (born 1989), Australian football player
 Benny Wearing (1901–1968), Australian rugby league player
 Clive Wearing (born 1938), British musicologist
 Gillian Wearing (born 1963), English conceptual artist
 J. P. Wearing (born circa 1945), English-American author
 Michael Wearing (1939–2017), British television producer
 William Alfred Wearing (1816–1875) South Australian Supreme Court judge

See also
Waring
Waering